James MacDonnell (23 April 1841 — 26 November 1891) was an Irish cricketer who played for Gloucestershire. He was born in Ireland and died in Brighton.

External links
James MacDonnell at Cricket Archive

References 

Irish cricketers
Gloucestershire cricketers
1841 births
1891 deaths